Pomortsevo is a rural locality (a village) in Dobryansky District, Perm Krai, Russia. The population was 21 as of 2010.

Geography 
Pomortsevo is located 67 km northeast of Dobryanka (the district's administrative centre) by road. Krutikovo is the nearest rural locality.

References 

Rural localities in Dobryansky District